Eric Kot Man-fai is a Hong Kong singer and actor who studied in California and is the second youngest of three brothers.

He formed a comedic music duo with fellow DJ and comedian Jan Lamb called Softhard in the 1980s.

He also runs a fashion store, ASIAACTSAGAINSTAIDS Like Black, focusing on selling menwear, denim, trucker hat and other accessories. Very often he do cross over merchandise with New Balance.

Filmography

Film

Television series

Award and nominations

Hong Kong Film Awards
 Best Supporting Actor Nomination for The New Age of Living Together
 Best Actor Nomination for Oh! My Three Guys
 Best Supporting Actor Nomination for Love in the Time of Twilight
(1 Best Actor Nomination, 2 Best Supporting Actor Nominations)

Golden Horse Awards
 Best Supporting Actor Nomination for A-1
(1 Best Supporting Actor Nomination)

References

External links
 
 
 Eric Kot at Hong Kong Cinemagic
 Eric Kot interviewed by Brian from Complex

1966 births
Hong Kong male singers
Cantopop singers
Living people
21st-century Hong Kong male actors
20th-century Hong Kong male actors
Hong Kong male film actors
Hong Kong male television actors
Hong Kong male comedians